The Women's 3000 metres competition at the 2017 World Single Distances Speed Skating Championships was held on 9 February 2017.

Results
The race started at 17:15.

References

Women's 3000 metres
World